Philip Gilbert Hamerton (10 September 1834 – 4 November 1894) was an English artist, art critic and author. He was a keen advocate of contemporary printmaking and most of his writings concern the graphic arts.  He was an important theorist of the English Etching Revival.

Early life
Hamerton was born at Laneside, a hamlet near Shaw and Crompton, Lancashire, England. His mother died giving birth to him, and his father died ten years later. When he was about five, he was sent to live with his two aunts at an estate called the Hollins on the edge of Burnley, where he attended Burnley Grammar School.

Career

Hamerton's first literary attempt, a volume of poems, was unsuccessful, leading him to devote himself for a time entirely to landscape painting; he camped out in the Scottish Highlands, where he eventually rented the former island of Inistrynich in Loch Awe, upon which he settled with his wife Eugénie Gindriez, the daughter of a French republican magistrate, in 1858.

Discovering after a time that he was more suited to art criticism than painting, he moved to Sens and later to Autun, where he produced his Painter's Camp in the Highlands (1863), which was very successful and prepared the way for his standard work on Etching and Etchers (1866). In the following year he published Contemporary French Painters, and in 1868 a continuation, Painting in France after the Decline of Classicism.

He had by now become art critic to the Saturday Review, which necessitated frequent visits to England, forcing him to give it up. He proceeded in 1870 to establish and edit an art journal of his own, The Portfolio, a monthly periodical, each number of which included of a monograph upon some artist or group of artists, often written by him. The journal championed printmaking, especially etching. He selected and wrote the accompanying text for Etchings by French and English Artists (London: Seeley, 1874) which included work by Alphonse Legros and Léon Gaucherel. The discontinuation of his painting gave him time for writing, and he successively produced The Intellectual Life (1873), perhaps the best known and most valuable of his writings; Round my House (1876), notes on French society by a resident; and Modern Frenchmen (1879), admirable short biographies. He also wrote two novels, Wenderholme (1870) and Marmorne (1878).

In 1884 Human Intercourse, another volume of essays, was published, and shortly afterwards Hamerton began his autobiography, which he brought down to 1858. In 1882 he issued a finely illustrated work on the technique of the great masters of various arts, under the title of The Graphic Arts, and three years later another splendidly illustrated volume, Landscape, which traces the influence of landscape upon the mind of man. His last books were: Portfolio Papers (1889) and French and English (1889). In 1891 he removed to the neighbourhood of Paris, where he died suddenly in Boulogne-sur-Mer, occupied to the last with his labours on The Portfolio and other writings on art.

In 1896 was published Philip Gilbert Hamerton: an Autobiography, 1834–1858; and a Memoir by his wife, 1858–1894.

Notes

References

 Marie Czach (1985). Philip Gilbert Hamerton: Victorian Art Critic, unpublished Ph.D. dissertation, University of Illinois at Urbana-Champaign.
Autun, Philip Gilbert Hamerton, Préface et postface Coline Béry, illustrations Anne Vanier, Collection Corde Raide 2019.

External links 

 
 
 

1834 births
1894 deaths
19th-century British journalists
19th-century English male artists
19th-century English male writers
19th-century English memoirists
19th-century English novelists
19th-century English painters
19th-century English poets
19th-century essayists
People from Burnley
People from Shaw and Crompton
People educated at Burnley Grammar School
English male painters
British male journalists
English art critics
English art historians
English male novelists
English male non-fiction writers